Jurassic Park typically refers to the Jurassic Park franchise, a series of books, films, and video games centering around a fictional theme park.

Arts, entertainment, and media

Novel and film adaptations
Jurassic Park (novel), a 1990 novel by Michael Crichton
Jurassic Park (film), the 1993 film adaptation directed by Steven Spielberg, based on the novel
The Lost World: Jurassic Park (1997), the second film in the series
Jurassic Park III (2001), the third film in the series

Games
Jurassic Park (arcade game), a 1994 a rail shooter arcade video game from Sega
Jurassic Park (computer video game), a 1993 Ocean Software game for Amiga and MS-DOS
Jurassic Park (NES video game), a 1993 video game for the Nintendo Entertainment System
Jurassic Park (pinball), a 1993 pinball machine from Data East and 2019 pinball machine from Stern Pinball.
Jurassic Park (Sega video game), a 1993 video game for the Mega Drive/Genesis
Jurassic Park (Sega CD video game), a 1994 point-and-click adventure game
Jurassic Park (SNES video game), a 1993 action-adventure video game for the Super NES
Chaos Island: The Lost World, a 1997 Microsoft Windows game
Jurassic Park: Operation Genesis, a 2003 construction and management simulation for Windows, Xbox, and PlayStation 2
Jurassic Park: Survival, unreleased PlayStation 2 game
Jurassic Park: The Game, a 2011 episodic point-and-click adventure video game
Trespasser (video game), a 1998 Microsoft Windows game
Jurassic Park Interactive, a 1994 3DO video game
Jurassic Park 2: The Chaos Continues, a 1994 Super Nintendo and Game Boy game
Jurassic Park III: Island Attack, a 2001 Game Boy Advance game
The Lost World: Jurassic Park (arcade game), a 1997 arcade video game
The Lost World: Jurassic Park (console game), a 1997 PlayStation and Saturn game
Warpath: Jurassic Park, a 1999 PlayStation game

Music
Jurassic Park (film score), the musical score for the 1993 film, composed by John Williams
"Jurassic Park" (song), a 1993 parody song by "Weird Al" Yankovic
"T-Rex [Jurassic Park]", a track by Basshunter from his compilation album The Old Shit

Water rides
 Jurassic Park: The Ride, a water-based amusement ride located at Universal Studios Hollywood and Japan
 Jurassic Park Rapids Adventure
 Jurassic Park River Adventure

Other uses
Maple Leaf Square, a public square in Toronto, Ontario, Canada, also known colloquially as Jurassic Park when hosting outdoor viewing parties of significant Toronto Raptors NBA games 
Mississauga Celebration Square, a public square in Mississauga, Greater Toronto, Ontario, Canada, also known colloquially as Jurassic Park West when hosting outdoor viewing parties of significant Toronto Raptors NBA games

See also
Jurassic Park video games
Jurassic World (disambiguation)
Lost World (disambiguation)